Kakoijana reserved forest is located near Abhayapuri in Bongaigaon district of Assam. The forest is famous for golden langur. The forest is 17.24 km2.

The forest consist of around 60 endangered Golden langurs as well as scheduled I endangered species. People and non-governmental organisations are pressing hard to convert it into an wildlife sanctuary. Golden langurs are listed in the category of "rare species" in the Red Data Book of International Union for Conservation of Nature. It is home to rarest & highly endangered species like Binturong, Jungle Fowl, Pangolin, Hornbill, Leopard, Porcupine, Python, Lesser Adjutant, Stork, Flying Squirrel, Monitor Lizard, Barking Deer, Mongoose, Civets, Jungle Cat, Wild Cat.

Many research work has been done on primates here.

History 
The reserved forest was constituted in the year 1966  as reserved forest. It falls under Aie Valley Division. A petition at the Gauhati High Court was filed demanding it to be declared as wildlife sanctuary.

References

Notes

External links

Further reading 
 http://static1.1.sqspcdn.com/static/f/1200343/24266833/1390684041337/PC27_Horwich_et_al_golden_langur.pdf?token=74l8NHNaQ5DpmqObRDJ9rqU8MJM%3D
 http://wiienvis.nic.in/WriteReadData/UserFiles/file/update25.pdf

Protected areas of Assam
1966 establishments in Assam
Protected areas established in 1966